William David Forsyth (born 29 July 1946). known as Bill Forsyth, is a Scottish film director and writer known for his films Gregory's Girl (1981), Local Hero (1983) and Comfort and Joy (1984) as well as his adaptation of the Marilynne Robinson novel, Housekeeping (1987).

Biography
William David Forsyth was born on 29 July 1946 in Glasgow, Scotland. After leaving Knightswood School at the age of 17, he spent eight years making short documentary films, having formed Tree Films with fellow Scotsman Charles Gormley.

Forsyth first came to attention with a low-budget film, That Sinking Feeling, made with youth theatre actors and featuring a cameo appearance by the Edinburgh gallery owner Richard Demarco. The relative success of the film was carried to a far higher level by his next film Gregory's Girl in 1981. This featured some of the same young actors, in particular John Gordon Sinclair, as well as the acting debut of Clare Grogan. The film was a major hit and won 'Best Screenplay' in that year's BAFTA Awards.  In 1983 he wrote and directed the successful Local Hero, produced by David Puttnam, and featuring Burt Lancaster. It was rated in the top 100 films of the 1980s in a Premiere magazine recap of the decade. Forsyth's next film was the 1984 Comfort and Joy, about a Glasgow radio DJ caught in a rivalry between ice cream companies, which again featured Clare Grogan.

After Puttnam became the chairman of Columbia Pictures, he financed Forsyth's American debut, Housekeeping, an adaptation of Marilynne Robinson's 1981 novel. It was the first time Forsyth made a film based on another work. By the time it was released in November 1987, Puttnam was notoriously fired from Columbia, and the film was given minimal promotion due to its ties to the studio's ousted chairman. Despite the lack of financial success, Housekeeping did find critical acclaim and its reputation has continued to grow despite its limited availability.

Forsyth's next film, Breaking In, was another departure, this time coming from an original script written by John Sayles. Despite the scale wages for the lead role, Forsyth was able to cast Burt Reynolds who liked the script and was already a fan of Forsyth's movies. Once again, the critical acclaim for Forsyth's work was not met with financial success.

Forsyth would team with Warner Brothers on Being Human (1994), starring Robin Williams and featuring John Turturro. The film was about a man developing throughout his life and had scenes from pre-history, Ancient Rome, 16th-century Spanish conquistadors and modern day New York City. The film was not released fully due to bad reviews. After this experience Bill Forsyth was put off making films.

In 1999 he made Gregory's Two Girls as a sequel to Gregory's Girl, with John Gordon Sinclair playing the same character. Reviewing the film for The Guardian, Peter Bradshaw said: "This quaint film is from the stable of Forsyth movies such as That Sinking Feeling and Local Hero, and disconcertingly out of its time... all Forsyth's films have charm, including this one. But, unfortunately, Gregory's Two Girls has the unhappy distinction of being an Accidental Period Piece." However, Time Out Londons reviewer said: "There's still comic mileage in Gordon-Sinclair's amiable fumbling Gregory... [A]ttention is directed towards wider, broadly political issues, but Forsyth's assured craftsmanship ensures that they are deftly woven into the storytelling. Gordon-Sinclair is a revelation, and although the film suffers from a lack of pace, its wealth of human insight and the premium it places on subtlety of expression make it a rare pleasure.

Filmography

Awards and nominations
 1981 BAFTA Award for Best Screenplay (Gregory's Girl) – Won 1981 BAFTA Award Nomination for Best Direction (Gregory's Girl)
 1983 BAFTA Award for Best Direction (Local Hero) – Won 1983 BAFTA Award Nomination for Best Screenplay (Local Hero)
 1983 New York Film Critics Circle Award for Best Screenplay (Local Hero) – Won'''
 1984 BAFTA Award Nomination for Best Screenplay (Comfort and Joy'')

See also
Cinema of Scotland

References
Citations

Bibliography

External links
 
 
 Senses of Cinema: Great Directors Critical Database
 1985 interview & portrait

1946 births
Living people
Scottish film directors
Film people from Glasgow
Scottish screenwriters
Best Director BAFTA Award winners
Best Screenplay BAFTA Award winners
Alumni of the National Film and Television School